Miass is a city in Chelyabinsk Oblast, Russia, located  west of Chelyabinsk, on the eastern slope of the Southern Ural Mountains, on the bank of the river Miass. Population:

Name
The name Miass is taken from the Bashkirs, the indigenous inhabitants of these places, with the root of the word meaning "water" or "friend".

History

It was founded in 1773 as a copper mining factory. During the 19th century, the development was driven by the discovery of the richest gold deposits in the Urals. In the mid-19th century, the volume of gold mining went down, and the development of Miass also slowed. Town status was granted to Miass in 1923. In 1941, an automobile factory (which still operates as UralAZ) was built.

Administrative and municipal status
Within the framework of administrative divisions, it is, together with twenty-eight rural localities, incorporated as the City of Miass—an administrative unit with the status equal to that of the districts. As a municipal division, the City of Miass is incorporated as Miassky Urban Okrug.

Economy and education
Currently Miass is a major machinery center. The truck manufacturer UralAZ is one of its most important factories.

UralAZ
UralAZ produces multiaxle-axle, full-drive trucks of high cross-country passability and exports 8% of the trucks. "UralAZ" was included in the rating of 200 biggest Russian companies in 2000 in volume of sales, and employs 105,000 people. It was established in 1942, when the ZiS factory was evacuated from Moscow during World War II.

The State Rocket Center 
The Makeyev Rocket Design Bureau creates submarine-launched ballistic missiles. In 1955, it was moved from Zlatoust, where it was established in 1947, to Miass.

Population
Ethnic composition (2010):
 Russians – 89.4%
 Bashkirs – 3.6%
 Tatars – 3.4%
 Ukrainians  1.1%
 others – 2.5%

Tourism
The old part of the city comprises 19th-century wooden houses with original balconies, jambs, and lintels.  The house of the gold mine's administrator, Simonov, has also been preserved.

Lake Turgoyak is located near Miass and is a popular tourist location, with crystal clear water.

Miass has a rich mineralogical museum, as it is close to the Ilmensky Mineral conservation area.

To the East of Miass is the Ilmenskyy Zapovednik, a large protected forest. Not far into the forest, trails lead to fresh-water springs.

Gallery

References

Notes

Sources

External links

Official website of Miass 
Unofficial website of Miass 

Cities and towns in Chelyabinsk Oblast
Naukograds